Nasimshahr railway station (Persian:ايستگاه راه آهن نسیم شهر, Istgah-e Rah Ahan-e Nasimshahr) is located in Nasimshahr, Tehran Province. The station is owned by IRI Railway.

References

External links

Railway stations in Iran